The 1999 Ekiti State gubernatorial election occurred in Nigeria on January 9, 1999. The AD nominee Niyi Adebayo won the election defeating the PDP candidate.

Niyi Adebayo emerged AD candidate.

Electoral system
The Governor of Ekiti State is elected using the plurality voting system.

Primary election

AD primary
The AD primary election was won by Niyi Adebayo.

Results
The total number of registered voters in the state was 1,075,278. Total number of votes cast was 504,958, while number of valid votes was 494,963. Rejected votes were 9,995.

References 

Ekiti State gubernatorial elections
Ekiti State gubernatorial election
Ekiti State gubernatorial election
Ekiti State gubernatorial election